Solstad Offshore is a Norwegian offshore service and supply ship shipping company that operates  89 vessels and including 26 construction service vessels, 21 anchor handling tug supply vessels and 42 platform supply vessels. The company is based in Skudeneshavn, but also has offices in Ålesund, Aberdeen, Rio de Janeiro, Perth, Singapore, Manila and Odessa.

The company has been renamed to Solstad Offshore from Solstad Farstad on 3rd Oct 2018.

History
The company was founded as Solstad Rederi by Johannes Solstad in 1964, in a town called Skudeneshavn, on the island of Karmøy, where it is still headquartered to this day. By 1982 the entire dry bulk fleet had been sold and Solstad continued as a pure offshore vessel operator, though from 1989 to 1998 it operated five handysize bulk carriers. A fleet renewal program started in 1996 increased the fleet size from 12 to 43 by 2007. The same year it was floated on the Oslo Stock Exchange, though the Solstad family retains a major ownership in the company.

Since its initial start in 1964, Solstad Offshore ASA now has become one of the biggest players of modern and advanced vessels for offshore service, with worldwide activities and projects for many of the major oil companies.

Solstad Offshore ASA is a member of the Norwegian Shipowners Association (Rederiforbundet). The company employs about 1800 people,  and has since 2005 been the shipping company with most Norwegian crew sailing in international trade.

In October 2021, Solstad Offshore, Aker Solutions ASA and DeepOcean Norway AS  joined forces to create Windstaller Alliance. The partnership aims to provide the world’s most cost-efficient and complete product supply, fabrication and marine services offering within offshore wind. The alliance will also pursue other offshore renewables segments.

The company has offices in Skudeneshavn (Norway), Aberdeen (United Kingdom), Singapore (Singapore), Macae and Rio de Janeiro (Brazil) and Perth (Australia).

In June 2017, Solstad Offshore merged with Farstad Shipping and Deep Sea Supply to become Solstad Farstad.

In October 2018, the company's name was changed to Solstad Offshore ASA.

References

Shipping companies of Norway
Supply shipping companies
Transport companies established in 1964
Non-renewable resource companies established in 1964
1964 establishments in Norway
Companies listed on the Oslo Stock Exchange